Ramsay Brothers is a pseudonym or brand name used for a family of Bollywood filmmakers, the sons and grandsons of F.U. Ramsay. They are famous for making the genre of horror films synonymous with the name "Ramsay Brothers."

History
The actual surname of the Ramsay family is Ramsinghani, and they are a Hindu family hailing from Sindh province in present-day Pakistan. They belong to a trading caste, and in the early decades of the 20th century, the Ramsinghani family used to run electronics shops (mainly radio sets) in Karachi and Lahore.  In 1947, the Partition of India happened, and they were forced to flee their native land, which had been their motherland since time immemorial, for fear of being killed by the Muslims. Penniless and destitute, Fatehchand U. Ramsay (F.U. Ramsay) came with his extended family, including his wife, seven sons and two daughters, to India. They were resettled in Mumbai, and Fatehchand, along with his elder sons, set up a tiny electronics shop in Lamington Road, thanks to a dealership agreement with the same manufacturer of radio sets and other electronic goods who had been their principal in Karachi. The shop did reasonably well, but the family was large, and money was not abundant.

Then as now, Mumbai was the center of showbiz in India. For reasons that are not clearly understood, but perhaps lured by the lottery-like wealth which the film industry blandished, Fatehchand joined a group of other Sindhi refugee businessmen to produce the film Shaheed-e-Azam Bhagat Singh (1954). It was a dismal flop, despite featuring a rendition of Sarfaroshi ki tamanna in Mohammad Rafi's voice. A long hiatus followed, but the lure of the movies was great, and Fatehchand later produced the films Rustam Sohrab (1963) and Ek Nanhi Munni Ladki Thi (1970). All of these films flopped, and the Ramsays were reeling under huge debts when inspiration struck. In a scene in Ek Nanhi Munni Ladki Thi, Prithviraj Kapoor wears a devil's mask to carry out a robbery and terrifies Mumtaz. The film didn't work, but it was noticed that the “monster” sequence was popular with the audience. This encouraged the Ramsays (as they were known) to experiment with Do Gaz Zameen Ke Neeche (1971), based on a story narrated by Fatehchand's daughter Asha to her father. The film was advertised in a half-hour, late-night show on radio, which helped it get the “Houseful” board up when it was released. Its success sparked a trend of shoe-string budget movies that were wrapped up in a month with a crew of 15.

The Ramsay Brothers have made more than 30 horror films in India, which epitomize the lower depths of 1980s Bollywood sleaze and gore, but which have secured their place in Hindi cinema's hall of fame as the pioneers of horror.
They are producers, directors and editors for many famous Hindi horror movies such as Guest House (1980 film), Veerana, Purana Mandir, Purani Haveli (film), Darwaza and Bandh Darwaza, Saboot and the TV series "Zee Horror Show". Their first film Do Gaz Zameen Ke Neeche proved a milestone for them and for Indian horror film industry. At a time when the average Hindi film took about a year and 50 lakhs to complete, Do Gaz Zameen Ke Neeche was shot in 40 days on a budget of Rs 3.5 lakhs. All the seven Ramsay brothers boarded buses with small-time actors, a sparse film crew, their wives and parents and drove to a government guesthouse in Mahabaleshwar that cost Rs 12 a room – they took eight rooms. They didn't spend on sets because they shot on location. They didn't spend on costumes because these were picked out of actors’ wardrobes. The cameras were all borrowed. All the departments for making the film was taken care of by the seven brothers. The film ran to full houses in the first week after its release. It made Rs 45 lakhs. Their 1980s horror films are generally considered as the combination of sex and supernatural. Their production Mahakaal in 1994 was also successful as a mixture of horror, romance and comedy. 

Actor-producer Ajay Devgn and Priti Sinha have acquired the rights to produce a biopic on Ramsay Brothers. The film will be titled as The Ramsay Biopic. The script will be written by Ritesh Shah.

Filmography

The family
The family includes seven brothers, who made cult horror films mainly in 70's and 80's decade. The brothers are Kumar Ramsay (eldest), Gangu Ramsay, Tulsi Ramsay, Arjun Ramsay, Shyam Ramsay, Keshu Ramsay and Kiran Ramsay. The brothers worked together for most of their careers and divided the various departments of filmmaking among them to produce movies. Kumar Ramsay handled the scripting, Gangu took care of the cinematography, Kiran Ramsay managed sound department, Keshu handled production, Arjun Ramsay took care of editing and Shyam Ramsay with Tulsi Ramsay handled the direction department.

They are a team of seven brothers:
 Kumar Ramsay
 Keshu Ramsay
 Tulsi Ramsay
 Kiran Ramsay 
 Shyam Ramsay
 Gangu Ramsay
 Arjun Ramsay
Asha and Kamla were the two daughters of Fatehchand Ramsey, they were the beloved sisters of the seven brothers.

See also
 List of Hindi horror films

External links
 Blood Brothers: The Ramsay Film History

https://harpercollins.co.in/product/ghosts-in-our-backyard/

References

Sibling filmmakers
Living people
Indian filmmaking duos
Year of birth missing (living people)